Mortgage may refer to:

 Mortgage loan, a loan secured by a mortgage on real property 
 Mortgage, a security interest on real property grant to a lender, as in mortgage law
 Chattel mortgage
 Deed, the mortgage document
 Hypothec, a specie of encumbrance
 Mortgage (film), a 1990 Australian drama film

See also 
 Security interest